Gitanjali or Geetanjali is an Indian feminine given name. There is a famous woman named Gitanjali F. Patel.

Notable people 
 Gitanjali S. Gutierrez, American lawyer
 Geetanjali Misra, Indian feminist
 Gitanjali Rao (born 1972), Indian theatre artist, animator and film maker
 Geetanjali Shree (born 1957), Indian Hindi-language novelist
 Geetanjali Thapa, Indian actress
 Geetanjali Tikekar, Indian TV actress

See also
Geetanjali (disambiguation)

Indian feminine given names